Hi-Standard (stylized as Hi-STANDARD) is a Japanese punk rock band formed in 1991 by bassist and lead vocalist Akihiro Nanba, guitarist and vocalist Ken Yokoyama, and drummer Akira Tsuneoka. The release Making the Road sparked sold-out Japan shows and U.S./European tours with punk bands such as NOFX, No Use for a Name, and Wizo. Although the members of Hi-Standard are Japanese, all of the band's major releases are sung in English.

History

Formation and early history: 1991–2000 
Forming in August 1991 as a four-piece band, the initial lineup of Hi-Standard contained lead vocalist Atsuhiko Matsumoto. However, shortly after recording their first demo tape in 1992, Matsumoto left the group, with bassist Akihiro Nanba taking over vocal duties, solidifying Hi-Standard's lineup as a power trio. 

In 1994, they released their debut mini-album Last of Sunny Day. Three months later, they released a 7" titled "In the Brightly Moonlight", and embarked on numerous tours across Japan throughout the mid-90s. 

The following year in 1995, they released their first full-length LP Growing Up, which was recorded in the United States. Shortly after, they accompanied American bands Green Day and Rancid on their tours of Japan. The LP was subsequently re-released on Fat Wreck Chords in 1996.

In 1997, their second full-length album, Angry Fist, was released, selling  500,000 copies worldwide. 

In 1998, Hi-Standard, joined by the American band NOFX, embarked on a US/Canada tour. Over the following months, they participated in the 1998 Warped Tour, headlined the '98 Air Jam to an audience of 30,000, and once again joined NOFX on a European tour. 

Riding the wave of successes from their prior albums and touring, they released their third album, Making the Road, in 1999.

Hiatus: 2000–2011 
After recording five Hi-Standard albums, the band entered a hiatus in August 2000, shortly after playing "Air Jam 2000". Guitarist Ken Yokoyama began working on other projects, including solo work in a similar vein to Hi-Standard, as well as exploring a more traditional hardcore punk style with BBQ Chickens, fronted by longtime friend and artist, Daisuke Hongolian, who provided artwork for some of Hi-Standard's early releases. Yokoyama revisited the band's original label Pizza of Death Records, which has since signed many punk and alternative rock bands. Bassist Akihiro Nanba's newest project is Ultra Brain. According to CDJapan, Nanba proclaims their debut album, Neo Punk, to be the birth of neo-punk. Akira Tsuneoka provided the drums for the group Cubismo Grafico Five.

Reformation: 2011–present 
In 2011, it was announced that Hi-Standard would be reforming. The band played at 'Air Jam 2011', and 'Air Jam 2012', and headlined the Japanese edition of Fat Wreck Chords' 25th-anniversary show in Tokyo in November 2015. The single "Another Starting Line" was released on October 5, 2016 with no preceding PR campaign, and available exclusively in stores. In 2017, they released The Gift, their first album in over 15 years.  
  
Akira Tsuneoka died on February 14, 2023, at the age of 51.

Band members 
  – lead vocals, bass
  – guitar, backing vocals
Former members
  – lead vocals
  – drums

Discography

Studio albums

Singles

Other albums

Music videos
 Maximum Overdrive
 New Life
 Growing Up
 The Sound of Secret Minds
 The Kids Are Alright
 Brand New Sunset
 Stay Gold
 Teenagers Are All Assholes
 Another Starting Line
 All Generations

References

External links
 
 Pizza of Death Records
 Fat Wreck Chords
 

Fat Wreck Chords artists
Japanese punk rock groups
Musical groups established in 1991
1991 establishments in Japan
Japanese pop punk groups
Melodic hardcore groups
English-language musical groups from Japan